The Kenya women's national handball team is the national team of Kenya. It is governed by the Kenya Handball Federation and takes part in international handball competitions.

African Championship record
2021 – 10th place

References

External links
IHF profile

Women's national handball teams
Handball
National team